Michael Lamb may refer to:
 Michael Lamb (politician), controller of the city of Pittsburgh
 Michael Lamb (psychologist), professor of psychology at Cambridge University
 Mike Lamb (Michael Robert Lamb, born 1975), American baseball player
 Michael Wayne Lamb (1920–2001), Broadway dancer, choreographer, theatre director and dance professor
 Michael Lamb, a character in the 1988 film Lamb

See also
 Michael Lam, actor